The Clarke/Duke Project is the first collaborative album by American musicians Stanley Clarke and George Duke. It was released in 1981 through Epic Records. The main recording sessions took place at Studio D of Fantasy Studios in Berkeley, California with additional recording at Le Gonks West, Westlake Studios and A&M Studios in Hollywood, California.

The album peaked at number 33 on the Billboard 200 and at number 7 on the Top R&B/Hip-Hop Albums chart. Its lead single, "Sweet Baby", made it to number 19 on the Hot 100 singles chart. In 1982, the album was nominated for Best R&B Performance by a Duo or Group at 24th Annual Grammy Awards.

Track listing

Personnel

George Duke – vocals, keyboards, percussion, string arrangement (tracks: 3, 8), bass synthesizer (track 7), producer
Stanley Clarke – vocals, bass, guitar, sitar, cello, string arrangement (tracks: 4, 8), producer
Michael Boddicker – bass synthesizer (track 7)
John Frederick Robinson – drums
Norman Gary Foster – saxophone (track 3)
Jerry Hey – piccolo trumpet C (track 8)
Frederick Seykora – strings
Israel Baker – strings
Endre Granat – strings
Paula Hochhalter – strings
Barbara Thomason – strings
Marcia Van Dyke – strings
Bonnie Douglas – strings
Selene Hurford – strings
Denyse Buffum – strings
Sheldon Sanov – strings
Kenneth Yerke – strings
Rollice Dale – strings
Dorothy Wade – strings
Nils Oliver – strings
Assa Drori – strings
Art Royval – strings
Charles Veal Jr. – concertmaster
George Del Barrio – conducting
Brent Averill – engineering
Tommy Vicari – engineering
Dave Concors – engineering
Jim Cassell – engineering
Erik Zobler – engineering
Wally Buck – mixing assistant
George Horn – mastering
Kathe Hoffman – album coordinator

Chart history

References

External links 

George Duke's 1980s discography on his website

1981 albums
George Duke albums
Stanley Clarke albums
Epic Records albums
Collaborative albums
Albums produced by George Duke
Albums produced by Stanley Clarke